Hoosier Township may refer to the following townships in the United States:

 Hoosier Township, Clay County, Illinois
 Hoosier Township, Kingman County, Kansas